Bletchley TMD is a railway traction maintenance depot situated in Bletchley, Milton Keynes in  Buckinghamshire, to the north east of Bletchley railway station, on a siding off the Marston Vale line. The depot is operated by London Northwestern Railway.

History
The original London and North Western Railway locomotive shed in Bletchley was a wooden and galvanised iron building that catered for some twelve engines, with three roads accommodated within the facility. However during the 1870s the shed collapsed in a gale, burying stabled locomotives and was replaced by two gabled roof spans with numerous ducts and chimneys. These sheds were situated just north of the railway station on a siding to the west side of the West Coast Main Line, on a site now occupied by today's carpark.

Towards the end of the 19th century, a number of LNWR Lady of the Lake class steam locomotives  were employed as pilot engines, with ‘Bletchley Shed’ as their home depot  by then considered an intermediate Loco Shed. This was locomotive No. 48610  LMS Stanier Class 8F 2-8-0, which had been stabled at Bletchley for ten years. With the end of steam, the TMD was relocated to the Bedford side of the Varsity line flyover, in a new purpose built facility.

Present
Bletchley TMD began in the modern era in 1965 (though it had existed since 1850, in the age of steam). It closed on 30 June 2008 and its (expired) lease returned to Network Rail. Bletchley had won awards for the reliability of its trains as recently as March 2007, and was said to deliver six times better than average reliability. London Midland phased in the fleet of 37 Class 350/2 Desiro trains, which are maintained by Siemens at the King's Heath depot in Northampton. These replaced the Silverlink Class 321 fleet which had been serviced at Bletchley. Most of the engineers & technicians transferred to the Siemens site and the cleaners to London Midland.

The local press had previously expressed concern that the previous diesel trains used on the Marston Vale Line were based at Tyseley TMD in Birmingham, with consequent long delays to service resumption in the event of train failure.

Following the introduction of the Class 230 diesel units, which are used exclusively on the Marston Vale Line, the depot was bought back into use in September 2018.

See also

List of British Railways shed codes

References

 

Railway depots in England
Rail transport in Milton Keynes
1850 establishments in England
2008 disestablishments in England